"Life's a Mess" is a song by American rapper and singer Juice Wrld and American singer Halsey. It was released on July 6, 2020 through Grade A Productions under exclusive license to Interscope Records as the third single for Juice Wrld's posthumous studio album, Legends Never Die, and was later included on Halsey's Collabs EP that dropped 3 weeks after. It was released the same day that Juice Wrld's estate announced the album and the release date of it. This marks the second collaboration between the two artists, following the remix of Halsey's chart-topping single "Without Me".

Other versions
On March 5, 2021, American singer Clever released what would be the original version of the song, featuring Juice WRLD (before the album version with Halsey released in July 2020), titled "Life's A Mess II". The song also features vocals from Post Malone.

Credits and personnel
Credits adapted from Tidal.
 Jarad Higgins – vocals, songwriting, composition
 Ashley Frangipane – vocals, songwriting, composition
 Rex Kudo – songwriting, composition, production
 Charlie Handsome – production
 Heavy Mellow – additional production
 Rick Rubin - additional production
 Ryan Vojesak – songwriting, composition
 Manny Marroquin – mixing, studio personnel
 Chris Galland – mixing assistance

Charts

Weekly charts

“Life's a Mess II”

Certifications

Release history

References

2020 singles
2020 songs
Juice Wrld songs
Halsey (singer) songs
Post Malone songs
Songs written by Halsey (singer)
Songs written by Juice Wrld
Songs written by Post Malone
Songs released posthumously
Interscope Records singles